The 2010 Romanian International Darts Open was the first edition of Romanian International Darts Open, organised by the Romanian Darts Federation. The tournament took place 9-11 October 2010 in Bucharest, Romania. The winner was Nándor Bezzeg who beat Mirianthous Marios, in the final, by 6 legs to 0.

Men's tournament

References

Romanian International Darts Open
Romanian International Darts Open
Darts Open
Romanian International Darts Open